Kim Ju-hyoung is a South Korean football player, who played as a forward for Chungju Hummel.

Club career

Kim joined Daejeon Citizen in 2010 as one of the club's draft picks. His first league appearance was on 28 August 2010, as a late substitute in Daejeon's home loss to Jeju United. He remained with Daejeon for 2011 but had limited chances during the season, with his sole league appearance being in the heavy loss to the Pohang Steelers on 9 July 2011. Before the 2012 K-League campaign, Daejeon declined to extend his contract.

Club career statistics

References

External links

1989 births
Living people
Association football forwards
South Korean footballers
Daejeon Hana Citizen FC players
Suwon FC players
K League 1 players
K League 2 players
Chungju Hummel FC players
Korea National League players